Sheila Roberge was a Republican member of the New Hampshire Senate, representing the 9th District from 1984 to 2010.

External links
The New Hampshire Senate - Senator Sheila Roberge official government website
Project Vote Smart - Senator Sheila Roberge (NH) profile 
Sheila Roberge - Ballotpedia
Follow the Money - Sheila Roberge
2006 20042002 2000 1998 1996 campaign contributions

Republican Party New Hampshire state senators
Living people
Women state legislators in New Hampshire
Year of birth missing (living people)
21st-century American women